Conor Byrne (died 19 April 1948) was an Irish politician and medical doctor. He was first elected to Dáil Éireann as a Sinn Féin Teachta Dála (TD) for the Longford–Westmeath constituency at the 1923 general election.  He did not take his seat in the Dáil due to Sinn Féin's abstentionist policy. 

He lost his seat at the June 1927 general election. He stood as a Clann na Poblachta candidate at the 1948 general election but was not elected.

References

Year of birth missing
1948 deaths
Early Sinn Féin TDs
Clann na Poblachta politicians
Members of the 4th Dáil
20th-century Irish medical doctors